Naval Station Mayport  is a major United States Navy base in Jacksonville, Florida.

Base history

The station was commissioned in December 1942. It was reclassified as a Naval Sea Frontier base in 1943. A new naval auxiliary air station (NAAS) was established in April 1944. The naval section Base and the NAAS supported the Atlantic Fleet during World War II. Both were closed after the war. In June 1948, Mayport was reestablished as a naval outlying landing field.

 became the first capital ship to use the new aircraft carrier basin in October 1952. The Base was renamed back to a Naval Auxiliary Air Station in July 1955. The naval station was extended to accommodate more ships, sailors and their families and redesignated as a naval air station in 1988.

NS Mayport has grown to become the third-largest naval surface fleet concentration area in the United States. The station has a busy harbor capable of accommodating 34 ships and an  runway capable of handling most aircraft in the Department of Defense inventory.

Naval Station Mayport is also home to the Navy's U.S. Naval Forces Southern Command / United States Fourth Fleet, reactivated in 2008 after being deactivated in 1950.

The base has historically served as the homeport to various conventionally powered aircraft carriers of the United States Atlantic Fleet, including  (1960–1971),  (1956–1977),  (1977–1993),  (1957–1994), and, most recently,  (1995–2007). With the decommissioning of all conventionally-powered aircraft carriers by the U.S. Navy, no carriers are presently assigned to Mayport. However, both houses of Congress have passed legislation authorizing about US$75 million for dredging and upgrades at NAVSTA Mayport to accommodate a nuclear-powered aircraft carrier.

On 29 January 2010, the Quadrennial Defense Review Report stated that a nuclear aircraft carrier would be homeported at NS Mayport. The action will help protect the fleet against a potential terror attack, accident or natural disaster, because all east coast aircraft carriers are currently based at Naval Station Norfolk, Virginia, according to the report. West coast aircraft carriers are split between Naval Air Station North Island in San Diego, California, Naval Base Kitsap and Naval Station Everett in Washington state and one carrier assigned to the Forward Deployed Naval Force (FDNF) homeported at Naval Base Yokosuka, Japan.

In 2009, Robert Gates, Secretary of Defense, stated, "Having a single (nuclear carrier) homeport has not been considered acceptable on the west coast and should not be considered acceptable on the east coast." The decision was opposed by elected officials in Virginia, who would lose 3,500 sailors and their dependents, $425 million in revenue each year, and most importantly, 6,000 support jobs. The Hampton Roads Chamber of Commerce estimated the loss at 11,000 jobs and $650 million per year. Infrastructure changes and facility construction at Mayport were estimated to take five years and cost over half a billion dollars. The 2011 budget committed $590 million during the fiscal years from 2011 to 2019, so a carrier may not move to Mayport until 2019. An amphibious group was assigned sooner. The  Amphibious Ready Group (ARG), consisting of Iwo Jima,  and  relocated to Mayport between December 2013 and August 2014.

The Virginia congressional delegation fought the loss of even one of Naval Station Norfolk's aircraft carriers boost to their economy by citing other areas such as shipbuilding to spend the Navy's tight budget.

On 5 September 2018, the Royal Navy's new aircraft carrier,  and escort frigate , arrived at Mayport for resupplying, on her first deployment to the United States for "Westlant 18".

Littoral Combat Ship Squadron Two
A 2013 report from the Navy revealed that they are considering basing as many as 14 littoral combat ships at NS Mayport. Littoral Combat Ship Squadron Two (LCSRON2) was established at the base on 7 November 2014. All Freedom variant LCSs, with the exception of the first two ships of the class ( and ), are to be assigned to LCSRON2.

Naval Surface Squadron Fourteen
Mayport had been the home of Destroyer Squadron 14 for years. On 31 July 2015, the squadron was merged with Cruiser-Destroyer Readiness Support Detachment Mayport to form Naval Surface Squadron Fourteen (NAVSURFRON14). Currently, the squadron consists of the destroyers Carney, The Sullivans, Lassen, Farragut, Thomas Hudner, Paul Ignatius, Delbert D. Black, Carney, Donald Cook, and Winston S. Churchill.

Iwo Jima Amphibious Ready Group
The Amphibious Ready Group is no longer based in Mayport. Iwo Jima shifted homeports to Naval Station Norfolk in December 2021, New York shifted in November 2021, and Fort McHenry was decommissioned in March 2021.

Homeported ships

Cutters (USCG) (1)

Destroyers (10)

Littoral Combat Ships (10)

Adm David L. McDonald Field
On 1 April 1944, the air facility at Mayport was commissioned as Naval Auxiliary Air Station (NAAS) Mayport. Following World War II, the NAAS was decommissioned and placed in a caretaker status. The United States Coast Guard took over the base and operated a small "Boot Camp" there for several years, but they vacated Mayport in late 1947 due to budget cuts. Mayport was reactivated again in June 1948 as a Naval Outlying Landing Field under the cognizance of the Commanding Officer, Naval Air Station Jacksonville. As helicopter aviation evolved during the Cold War, Mayport became the East Coast home for the Light Airborne Multi-Purpose System (LAMPS) MK III squadrons. As a reflection of growth, Naval Air Facility Mayport was re-designated as a naval air station in 1988.

Aircraft wings and squadrons
Helicopter wing
Helicopter Maritime Strike Wing, U.S. Atlantic Fleet

Helicopter squadrons
HSM-40 "Airwolves"
HSM-46 "Grandmasters"
HSM-48 "Vipers"
HSM-50 "Valkyries"

See also 

 List of United States Navy airfields

References

External links

 
 

Mayport
Airports in Jacksonville, Florida
Buildings and structures in Jacksonville, Florida
Military in Jacksonville, Florida
Military installations in Florida
1942 establishments in Florida